The Broken Cross is a 1911 American short silent romance film directed by D. W. Griffith, starring Charles West and featuring Blanche Sweet.

Cast
 Charles West as Tom
 Florence La Badie as Kate
 Grace Henderson as The Landlady
 Dorothy West as The Manicurist
 Vivian Prescott as Slavey
 Claire McDowell as Kate's Mother
 Blanche Sweet

See also
 List of American films of 1911
 D. W. Griffith filmography
 Blanche Sweet filmography

References

External links

1911 films
1910s romance films
1911 short films
American romance films
American silent short films
Biograph Company films
American black-and-white films
Films directed by D. W. Griffith
1910s American films